Facetti is an Italian surname. Notable people with the surname include:

Carlo Facetti (born 1935), Italian racing driver
Germano Facetti (1926–2006), Italian graphic designer

Italian-language surnames